Denmark is a 2010 short film co-written and directed by Daniel Fickle and scored by Gideon Freudmann of The Portland Cello Project. Utilizing puppetry and hand-built sets the film tells a story about Pily, a crustacean of mixed origin, who builds a rocket ship to escape his underwater home when it becomes threatened by pollution.

Denmark premiered at the Aladdin Theatre on May 15, 2010 in Portland, Oregon. The film achieved critical success thereafter largely through established film festivals and numerous features on websites.

Plot
Pily lives a pastoral life at the bottom of Oregon's Willamette River. He tends to his underwater crops in solitude and proves to be resourceful. His home is built from flotsam and sunken debris.

Seemingly content in the world he has built for himself, Pily is actually addled by a premonition that an invasive element is going to displace him. To prepare for the worst Pily devises an escape plan. He builds a rocketship.

When Pily's anxiety gives way to the reality of an oil spill his rocketship is ready except for one part that's essential to achieve liftoff. Pily goes ashore where he finds the missing part and returns to initiate his escape. Once airborne Pily is confronted with another challenge and reaches for a solution that doesn't exist.

Back story
"Denmark" is the title of the first track from The Portland Cello Project's album, A Thousand Words. The song was written by cellist Gideon Freudmann to honor the loss of a loved one who lost a battle to cancer; the song is a love letter and an inspired response against the indiscriminate nature of fate.

The film uses a stark form of humor to resonate the interplay of alienation, turmoil, and other emotions that are associated with reconciling loss. Recognizing that laughter has long been a way to cope with life's irreducible realities, the creators of Denmark, the film, use humor as a narrative device to mollify anguish and convey empathy.

Pily
Jason Miranda and Bill Holznagel were the hands behind Pily's performance in Denmark. The puppeteers used traditional means to create Pily's actions; Marionette bars, strings and wires. They also employed glove puppet techniques to move the puppet's eyes.

Official selections
SXSW
Cinequest Film Festival
Palm Beach International Film Festival
Ashland Independent Film Festival
Byron Bay Film Festival
 Sene
Zero Film Festival
 Ferndale Film Festival
Ann Arbor Film Festival
Olympia Film Festival
 Canada International Film Festival
Atlanta Film Festival
Bahamas International Film Festival
 Los Angeles Cinema Festival of Hollywood
Chicago International REEL Shorts Festival
 Vancouver DSLR Film Festival
 California Independent Film Festival
Science Fiction Fantasy Short Film Festival
 Santa Catalina Film festival
Buffalo Niagara Film Festival
Victoria Film Festival
 Desert Dust Cinema Short Film Festival
Athens Video Art Festival
Alpha-Ville Festival
Park City Music Film Festival
  Albuquerque Film Festival
  Fantadia International Multivision Festival
  California International Shorts Festival
New Orleans Film Festival
  Crested Butte Film Festival
  Milwaukee Film Festival
  Sapporo International Short Film Festival
  Imagine Science Film Festival
Malibu Film Festival
  Radar Hamburg International Independent Film Festival
 Philadelphia Film & Animation Festival
Henson International Festival BAM
Imagine Science Film Festival Dublin

Awards
Royal Reel Award: Canada International Film festival 2011
Best Music Video: Los Angeles Cinema of Hollywood 2010
Gold Medal for music in a short film: Park City Film Music Festival 2011
Best Music Video: Radar Hamburg International Independent Film Festival 2011

References

External links 

Articles containing video clips
2010s English-language films